The Benjamin Franklin Henley House is a historic house in rural Searcy County, Arkansas.  It is located northeast of St. Joe, on the south side of a side road off Arkansas Highway 374.  It is a single-story wood frame dogtrot house, with a projecting gable-roofed portico in front of the original breezeway area.  The house was built in stages, the first being a braced-frame half structure in about 1870, and the second room, completing the dogtrot, in 1876.

The house was listed on the National Register of Historic Places in 1985.

See also
National Register of Historic Places listings in Searcy County, Arkansas

References

Houses on the National Register of Historic Places in Arkansas
Greek Revival houses in Arkansas
Houses completed in 1870
Houses in Searcy County, Arkansas
National Register of Historic Places in Searcy County, Arkansas